Luís Carlos Neto da Costa (born 4 September 1998) known as Luís Timóteo, is a Portuguese professional footballer who plays for Tirsense as a defender.

References

External links

Portuguese League profile 

1998 births
Living people
People from Paços de Ferreira
Portuguese footballers
Association football defenders
Campeonato de Portugal (league) players
Liga Portugal 2 players
S.C. Freamunde players
SC Mirandela players
F.C. Tirsense players
Sportspeople from Porto District